1 is the Japanese debut studio album by the South Korean boy band B1A4. It was released on October 24, 2012 in three different editions.

Background
The album was announced by the group's Korean agency, WM Entertainment, with details of the album release and along with a release of the group's first DVD B1A4 History 2011-2012 in Japan. The album was released in three different editions: a CD+DVD, including the CD and a DVD including the music videos of "Beautiful Target" and "Oyasumi Good Night", as well its making-of videos, a CD+Goods, including the CD and a special member figure (one out of five different types) and a regular edition, including the CD itself and a special trading card (one out of five different types). All editions came with a special lottery ticket to a Premium Event of their first Japanese album.

Composition
The album is composed of ten songs: two singles, five new songs, and three Japanese versions of songs previously recorded in Korean. The tracks "O.K", "Only One" and "Waruikoto Bakari Manande" were originally recorded in Korean and released on the group's debut mini album Let's Fly.

Singles
Two songs from the album were released as singles:

The first single from the album is a Japanese version of "Beautiful Target". It was released on June 27, 2012 as the group's Japanese debut single. The original version of the song, recorded in Korean, was released on the group's second mini album It B1A4. It peaked number 4 on Oricon's Weekly chart with around 38,000 copies sold to date.

The second and final single from the album is a Japanese version of "Baby Good Night", retitled in Japanese to "Oyasumi Good Night". It was released on August 29, 2012  and peaked number 4 in Oricon's Weekly chart with around 39,000 copies sold to date. The original version of the song, recorded in Korean, was released on the special version of the group's first Korean album, Ignition.

Track listing

Charts

Oricon

Release history

References

2012 albums
Japanese-language albums
Pony Canyon albums
B1A4 albums